Below is a list of newspapers published in Lithuania. In 2006 there were 334 newspapers published.

National newspapers 
This is the list of national daily newspapers:
Lietuvos rytas
Lietuvos žinios
Lithuania Tribune
Respublika
Vakaro žinios
Verslo žinios

Regional newspapers

Alytus
 Alytaus Naujienos

Kaunas
 15 minučių Kaunas
 Kauno diena
 Laikinoji Sostinė

Klaipėda
 15 minučių Klaipėda (free)
 Klaipėda
 Vakarų ekspresas

Panevėžys
 Panevėžio balsas
 Panevėžio rytas
Panevėžio kraštas
Sekundė

Šiauliai
 Šiaulių kraštas
 Šiaulių naujienos

Vilnius
 15 minučių Vilnius (free)
 Kurier Wileński (in Polish)
 Sostinė
 Vilniaus diena

Other 
 Tėviškės žinios
 Voruta

References

External links
  Lithuanian newspapers online
  Advice website

Newspapers
Lithuania